Mapondera is a genus of cicadas in the family Cicadidae. There are at least two described species in Mapondera.

Species
These two species belong to the genus Mapondera:
 Mapondera capicola Kirkaldy, 1909 c g
 Mapondera hottentota Kirkaldy, 1909 c g
Data sources: i = ITIS, c = Catalogue of Life, g = GBIF, b = Bugguide.net

References

Further reading

 
 
 
 

Parnisini
Cicadidae genera